Eugene Victor Rostow (August 25, 1913 – November 25, 2002) was an American legal scholar and public servant. He was Dean of Yale Law School and served as Under Secretary of State for Political Affairs under President Lyndon B. Johnson.  In the 1970s Rostow was a leader of the movement against détente with Russia and in 1981, President Ronald Reagan appointed him director of the Arms Control and Disarmament Agency.

Early life 
Rostow was born in Brooklyn, New York, to Jewish immigrants from the Russian Empire, and raised in Irvington, New Jersey, and New Haven, Connecticut.  
His parents were active socialists and their three sons, Eugene, Ralph, and Walt, were named after Eugene V. Debs, Ralph Waldo Emerson, and Walt Whitman.

Education 
Rostow attended New Haven High School and was admitted to Yale College in 1929.  At the time, his scores on his entrance examinations were so high that The New York Times called him the first "perfect freshman". 
In 1931 he earned Phi Beta Kappa, and in 1933 he earned a B.A., graduating with highest honors, and receiving the Alpheus Henry Snow Prize, which is awarded annually to that senior who, through the combination of intellectual achievement, character and personality, shall be adjudged by the faculty to have done the most for Yale by inspiring in his classmates an admiration and love for the best traditions of high scholarship.  He became a member of Alpha Delta Phi.

From 1933 to 1934 Rostow studied economics at Cambridge University (where he would return in 1959 as the Pitt Professor of American History and Institutions) as a Henry Fellow. He then returned to Yale, attending Yale Law School, and earning his law degree with highest honors.  
From 1936 to 1937 he served as editor-in-chief of  the Yale Law Journal.

Career 
After graduation, Rostow worked at the New York law firm of Cravath, deGersdorff, Swaine and Wood specializing in bankruptcy, corporations, and antitrust.

In 1937 he returned to Yale Law School as a faculty member (becoming a full professor in 1944), and became a member of the Yale Economics Department as well.  Leon Lipson says,  "Throughout his career, he has woven ideas or beliefs about American constitutional bases and practices with others about international diplomacy, politics, and force. The linking threads are morality and law."

During World War II Rostow served in the Lend-Lease Administration as an assistant general counsel, in the State Department as liaison to the Lend-Lease Administration, and as an assistant to then–Assistant Secretary of State for Legislative Affairs Dean Acheson. He was an early and vocal critic of Japanese American internment and the Supreme Court decisions which supported it; in 1945 he wrote an influential paper in the Yale Law Journal which helped fuel the movement for restitution. In that paper he wrote, "We believe that the German people bear a common political responsibility for outrages secretly committed by the Gestapo and the SS.  What are we to think of our own part in a program which violates every democratic social value, yet has been approved by the Congress, the President and the Supreme Court?"

Dean of Yale Law School
In 1955, Rostow became dean of Yale Law School, a post he held until 1965. Towards the end of his tenure, he was appointed Sterling Professor of Law and Public Affairs. At one point in 1962 – according to Alistair Cooke – he was considered by John F. Kennedy for appointment to the Supreme Court but geographical and religious issues interfered.  From 1966 to 1969 he served as Under Secretary for Political Affairs in Lyndon B. Johnson's government, the third-highest-ranking official in the State Department. During this time he helped draft UN Security Council Resolution 242, one of the most important Security Council resolutions relevant to the Arab–Israeli conflict.

After leaving government service Rostow returned to Yale Law School, teaching courses in constitutional, international, and antitrust law.

Foreign policy
Rostow spent much of the 1970s in warning that détente was a dangerous fiction, downplayed Soviet military expansionism, and enabled a "Soviet drive for dominance" in the world.  
He was a leader of the Coalition for a Democratic Majority and helped found and lead the Committee on the Present Danger. In 1981, President Ronald Reagan appointed him director of the Arms Control and Disarmament Agency, which made Rostow the highest-ranking Democrat in the Reagan Administration.

At his confirmation hearing in 1981, Senator Claiborne Pell asked Rostow if he thought the US could survive a nuclear war. Rostow replied that Japan "not only survived but flourished after the nuclear attack." When questioners pointed out that the Soviet Union would attack with thousands of nuclear warheads, rather than two, Rostow replied, "the human race is very resilient.... Depending upon certain assumptions, some estimates predict that there would be ten million casualties on one side and one hundred million on another. But that is not the whole of the population."

In 1984, Rostow became Sterling Professor of Law and Public Affairs Emeritus.

In 1990, Rostow had this to say on the Geneva Convention/Oslo Accords and finding a peace between Israel and the Palestinians: "The Convention prohibits many of the inhumane practices of the Nazis and the Soviet Union during and before the Second World War – the mass transfer of people into and out of occupied territories for purposes of extermination, slave labor or colonization, for example.... The Jewish settlers in the West Bank are most emphatically volunteers. They have not been 'deported' or 'transferred' to the area by the Government of Israel, and their movement involves none of the atrocious purposes or harmful effects on the existing population it is the goal of the Geneva Convention to prevent."

Personal life
In 1933 Rostow married Edna Greenberg, and they remained married until his death from congestive heart failure.  Together they had three children, Victor, Jessica, and Nicholas. Had 6 grandchildren and 3 great grandchildren 
His younger brother, Walt Whitman Rostow, served as national security adviser to Presidents John F. Kennedy and Lyndon B. Johnson.

Selected publications 
 "The Japanese American Cases: A Disaster", 54 Yale Law Journal 489 (1945).
 A National Policy for the Oil Industry (1948)
 "The democratic character of judicial review." Harvard Law Review 66.2 (1952): 193–224. 
 Planning for Freedom (1959)
 The Sovereign Prerogative (1962)
 Law, Power, and the Pursuit of Peace (1968)
 Is Law Dead? (ed., 1971)
 "Great Cases Make Bad Law: The War Powers Act." Texas Law Review 50 (1971): 833+
 The Ideal in Law (1978)
 A Breakfast for Bonaparte US national security interests from the Heights of Abraham to the Nuclear age (1993), (Published as "Towards Managed Peace" under Yale University Press)

References

Further reading
 Goldstein, Abraham S. "Eugene V. Rostow as Dean, 1955-1965." Yale Law Journal (1985): 1323–1328. online
 Lipson, Leon. "Eugene Rostow." Yale Law Journal (1985): 1329–1335.   online
 Rosenberg, John. "The Quest against Détente: Eugene Rostow, the October War, and the Origins of the Anti-Détente Movement, 1969–1976." Diplomatic History 39.4 (2014): 720–744.
 Whitworth, William, and Eugene Victor Rostow. Naive questions about war and peace: Conversations with Eugene V. Rostow (W.W. Norton, 1970).

External links

 In Memoriam: Eugene V. Rostow, 1913–2002 (pdf).
 Eugene V. Rostow '37: Dean, Scholar, Statesman, Yale Law School.
 Eugene Victor Rostow papers (held at Yale University Library Manuscripts and Archives)
 

1913 births
2002 deaths
American legal scholars
American people of Russian-Jewish descent
New York (state) Democrats
New York (state) lawyers
Groton School alumni
Yale Law School alumni
Deans of Yale Law School
Lyndon B. Johnson administration personnel
Academics of the University of Cambridge
Yale Sterling Professors
Yale Law School faculty
Under Secretaries of State for Political Affairs
Cravath, Swaine & Moore people